Chulachuli is a rural municipality (gaunpalika) out of six rural municipality located in Ilam District of Province No. 1 of Nepal. There are a total of 10 municipalities in Ilam in which 4 are urban and 6 are rural.

Chalachuli was a Village development committee which turned into rural municipality when fulfilling the requirement of the new Constitution of Nepal 2015, Ministry of Federal Affairs and Local Development replaced all old VDCs and Municipalities into 753 new local level body (Municipality). To fulfil the requirements of a rural municipality an adjoining village development committee named Sakphara was added to it.

The rural municipality is divided into total 6 wards and the headquarter of this newly formed rural municipality is situated in ward no. 6

Former VDC
Formally Chulachuli was a Village Development Committee  in Ilam District in the Province No. 1 of eastern Nepal. At the time of the 1991 Nepal census it had a population of 18,176.

References

External links
UN map of the municipalities of Ilam District
 Official website
 Final District 1-75 Corrected Last for RAJPATRA

Rural municipalities in Ilam District
Rural municipalities in Koshi Province
Rural municipalities of Nepal established in 2017